The Engine House No. 11 in Tacoma, Washington, also known as Fire Station No. 11, at 3802 McKinley Ave., was built in 1909.  It was listed on the National Register of Historic Places in 1986.

It has a flared gable roof.

In 1985, it was still an active fire station.

In popular culture
The facade of this firehouse is the basis for the exterior shots of the firehouse on the television series Tacoma FD.

References

Fire stations on the National Register of Historic Places in Washington (state)
National Register of Historic Places in Tacoma, Washington
Fire stations completed in 1909